Vonette Dixon (born 26 November 1975) is a Jamaican hurdler.

She finished eighth at the 2001 World Championships in Edmonton, won a silver medal at the 2002 Commonwealth Games in Manchester and finished ninth at the 2003 World Championships in Paris. She finished seventh at the 2007 World Championships in Osaka.

Her personal best time is 12.64 seconds, achieved in August 2007 in Osaka.

Competition record

External links
 

1975 births
Living people
Jamaican female hurdlers
Olympic athletes of Jamaica
Athletes (track and field) at the 2008 Summer Olympics
Commonwealth Games medallists in athletics
Commonwealth Games silver medallists for Jamaica
Athletes (track and field) at the 2002 Commonwealth Games
Athletes (track and field) at the 2007 Pan American Games
Competitors at the 2001 Goodwill Games
Pan American Games competitors for Jamaica
20th-century Jamaican women
21st-century Jamaican women
Medallists at the 2002 Commonwealth Games